Vincent Corbet may refer to:

Sir Vincent Corbet, 1st Baronet (1617–1656), of the Corbet baronets
Sir Vincent Corbet, 2nd Baronet (c. 1642–1681), of the Corbet baronets, MP for Shropshire 1679
Sir Vincent Corbet, 3rd Baronet (1670–1688), of the Corbet baronets
Sir Vincent Rowland Corbet, 3rd Baronet (1821–1891), of the Corbet baronets